Charles Arthur Wheeler OBE, DCM (4 January 1881 – 26 October 1977) was an Australian painter.

Born in New Zealand, he arrived in Australia about 1891.

In World War I, he enlisted in the 22nd Battalion, Royal Fusiliers. His Distinguished Conduct Medal (DSM) (1916) was awarded for actions at Vimy Ridge.

He won the Archibald Prize for 1933.

In 1939 he was appointed master of the painting school at the national gallery, Melbourne.

References

1881 births
1977 deaths
New Zealand military personnel
Archibald Prize winners
New Zealand painters
Officers of the Order of the British Empire
Recipients of the Distinguished Conduct Medal
Royal Fusiliers soldiers
British Army personnel of World War I
20th-century Australian painters
20th-century Australian male artists
Australian male painters
New Zealand emigrants to Australia
Artists from Dunedin